The 2021 USL Championship Playoffs (branded as the 2021 USL Championship Playoffs presented by TwinSpires for sponsorship reasons) was the post-season championship of the 2021 USL Championship. It was the eleventh edition of the USL Championship Playoffs. The playoffs began on November 5, and concluded with the USL Championship Final on November 28.

Tampa Bay Rowdies won the regular season with 71 standings points. They were beaten in the Final by Orange County SC, which won its first league title.

Real Monarchs, having won the title in 2019, were the title holders, since the 2020 Final was cancelled due to the COVID-19 outbreak in the Rowdies and the title was not awarded. However, they were eliminated in the regular season as they finished bottom of the Mountain Division table.

Qualified teams

Atlantic Division
Charlotte Independence
Miami FC
Pittsburgh Riverhounds SC
Tampa Bay Rowdies

Central Division
Birmingham Legion FC
FC Tulsa
Louisville City FC
Memphis 901 FC

Mountain Division
Colorado Springs Switchbacks FC
El Paso Locomotive FC
Rio Grande Valley FC Toros
San Antonio FC

Pacific Division
Oakland Roots SC
Orange County SC
Phoenix Rising FC
San Diego Loyal SC

Format
The top four teams in each division qualified for the playoffs. They began to play on the first weekend on November, featuring a single-elimination, 16-team bracket. Under the revised season format, four division winners in each conference earned hosting rights for the Eastern and Western conference quarter-finals. Following the opening round, hosting rights were determined by regular season record (ranks, then points, then number of wins). All playoff matches were streamed live on ESPN+ except the Championship final on ESPN, ESPN Deportes, and Sirius XM FC.

Division tables

Atlantic Division

Central Division

Mountain Division

Pacific Division

Bracket

Schedule

Conference Quarter-finals

Conference Semi-finals

Conference Finals

USL Championship Final 

Championship Game MVP: Ronaldo Damus (Orange County SC)

Top goalscorers

Awards
Goal of the Playoffs:   Rodrigo López (RGV)
Save of the Playoffs:   Jordan Farr (SAN)

References

2021 USL Championship season
USL Championship Playoffs